Claudio Bortolotto (born 19 March 1952) is an Italian former professional cyclist. The highlight of his career came with his victories in the mountains classification at the Giro d'Italia, which he won in 1979, 1980, and 1981. Bortolotto finished also eighth overall in the 1977 and 1978 editions of the race. He retired from cycling in 1984.

Major results

1973
 5th Overall Giro Ciclistico d'Italia
1976
 4th Gran Premio Città di Camaiore
1977
 1st Gran Premio Industria e Commercio di Prato
 7th Overall Tirreno–Adriatico
 8th Overall Giro d'Italia
1st Stage 11
1978
 1st  Overall Grand Prix du Midi Libre
1st Stage 1 
 5th Giro della Romagna
 8th Overall Giro d'Italia
 9th Overall Volta a Catalunya
1979
 Giro d'Italia
1st  Mountains classification 
1st Stage 4 
 3rd Road race, National Road Championships
1980
 1st  Mountains classification Giro d'Italia
 2nd Giro dell'Etna
 2nd Giro della Provincia di Reggio Calabria
 10th Overall Tirreno–Adriatico
1981
 1st Coppa Sabatini
 3rd Giro della Provincia di Reggio Calabria
 4th Trofeo Pantalica
 5th Overall Giro del Trentino
 9th Overall Giro d'Italia
1st  Mountains classification 
 9th Overall Tirreno–Adriatico
 10th Overall Tour of the Basque Country
 10th Coppa Bernocchi
1982
 6th Milan–San Remo
 7th Overall Deutschland Tour
1st Stage 3

Grand Tour general classification results timeline

References

1952 births
Living people
Italian male cyclists
Cyclists from the Province of Treviso